Anarchy TV is a 1998 low budget, independent comedy film directed by Jonathan Blank. It stars Alan Thicke, Jessica Hecht, Jonathan Penner, Tamayo Otsuki, George Wendt, Mink Stole, and Ahmet, Dweezil, Diva and Moon Unit Zappa. Blank was nominated for the Maverick Spirit Award at the Cinequest San Jose Film Festival for Anarchy TV.

The plot involves a group of young people who run an uncensored public-access television cable TV. They are ejected from their show when the station is purchased by a televangelist, who considers their show pornographic. In response, the performers hijack the station and begin broadcasting a 24-hour all nude show in order to gain sympathy for their cause.

It received 4 stars from Charles Tatum on efilmcritic.com.

Director Jonathan Blank is the son of Marion Blank.

References

External links 
 Anarchytv.com
 Anarchy TV at IMDB

1998 films
American comedy films
1990s English-language films
1990s American films